4:17 am is the second full-length album released by Finnish band Before the Dawn. It was released on May 24, 2004 through Locomotive Music.

Critical reception
The Metal Storm website gave the CD a 8.7, the highest rating for any of the band's albums.  Gotherica rated it the 6th of "Top 10 Gothic & Alternative Albums of 2004, beating out Morrissey's You Are the Quary (sic.) and Penumbra's Seclusion, amongst others.

Background
Aleksanteri Kuosa was the engineer and producer for 4:17. The title of the album appears to be that 4:17 a.m. is "before the dawn," a pun on the band's name. Three years later, the band joined Stay Heavy Records.

The music video for the single End of Days was released throughout Europe and in Japan.  The Spirit of Metal website rated the video 17 out of 20. The song "My Room" was re-recorded as acoustic version with Lars Eikind (vocals) and released as a bonus track on the European edition of the 2011 album Deathstar Rising.

Track listing

References

External links
 Before the Dawn official website Band bio with information on 4:17
 Before the Dawn official website Media page
 2004 Interview at Noise.fi (in Finnish)

2004 albums
Before the Dawn (band) albums